On Sunday, February 10, 2013, a large EF4 multiple-vortex wedge tornado devastated the cities of West Hattiesburg, Hattiesburg, and Petal, Mississippi. The tornado was one of eight that touched down in southern Mississippi and southwestern Alabama that day. It destroyed many structures and impacted University of Southern Mississippi and two high schools (Oak Grove High School and Hattiesburg High School). Mississippi was declared a federal disaster area by President Barack Obama, and a state of emergency was issued by Mississippi Governor Phil Bryant.

Meteorological synopsis
The Storm Prediction Center (SPC) had stated as early as February 8 that a few supercells would possibly develop on the 10th and could produce large hail, damaging winds, and a few tornadoes. When the thunderstorm outlook was issued for the 10th, the SPC stated that only a marginal chance for severe thunderstorms existed and that only a few storms would develop. Most of the severe weather activity was expected to develop along the cold front in the form of a squall line. A 10% chance of isolated tornadoes was introduced as the instability remained marginal for the event.

During the morning hours of February 10, a squall line developed along a cold front that stretched from western Arkansas, down through northwest Louisiana, and into east Texas. Simultaneously, a warm front was ascending northward through Mississippi and Louisiana. The area between the fronts became increasingly unstable as the day went on, and four tornado watches were issued across Texas, Louisiana, Mississippi, and Alabama throughout the day as the storms tracked eastward. The watches were issued as very strong wind shear and instability engrossed the area, causing the development of supercell thunderstorms. These watches were issued through the day, with the first being posted at 7 a.m. CST (1300 UTC) and the last one coming out at 5:35 p.m. CST (2335 UTC).

Throughout the afternoon hours, the cold front and the squall line began to stall over portions of Louisiana and Arkansas. The supercells that developed that afternoon ahead of the squall line originated across Louisiana and southern Mississippi. Around 4 p.m. (2200 UTC), a newly developed supercell produced an EF2 tornado in Marion County, Mississippi. That tornado tracked northeast and entered Lamar County, where it dissipated. Later, that same supercell quickly produced another tornado – this was a large wedge tornado that hit the Hattiesburg area.

Tornado summary

The tornado touched down west-southwest of West Hattiesburg at around 5:03 p.m. CST (23:03 UTC), causing EF0 damage to tree limbs at the western edge of the community. It rapidly widened and intensified as it moved through residential subdivisions of the city, snapping numerous trees and power lines, severely damaging homes, and expanding to one half-mile wide. Further northeast, it narrowed as it struck Oak Grove High School, causing major damage to the school's athletic complex. Several well-constructed buildings around the school's athletic stadiums were destroyed, with twisting and buckling steel girders noted. Several steel light poles with concrete reinforcement were snapped as well. Vehicles were thrown in considerable distances, one of which was taken from a parking lot of the high school, rolled up a hill and across the baseball field, and then deposited onto the pitcher's mound. Much of the damage in this area ranged from EF2 to EF3 intensity, though an isolated pocket of EF4 damage occurred just to the southwest of the high school, as a well-built brick home was completely flattened with debris scattered downwind. Nearby trees were denuded and debarked. As it then approached I-59, the tornado heavily damaged numerous homes and apartment buildings at EF2 to EF3 strength, and snapped more trees and power lines. It crossed the interstate and entered Forrest County, tearing through densely populated areas of Hattiesburg, resulting in major damage.

In Forrest County, roughly 300 homes and other structures were damaged/destroyed as the tornado moved through various neighborhoods and business districts. The University of Southern Mississippi sustained significant damage to the southern portion of its campus; at least six buildings were damaged and two others were destroyed there. Near the university, a gas station, a strip mall, a church, an apartment building, and multiple homes were damaged/destroyed, and some metal traffic light poles were mangled. The tornado continued through residential areas to the east of U.S. 49, where many trees were uprooted, homes were heavily damaged, and a church's steeple was blown off. Large metal light poles at the athletic fields of Hattiesburg High School were snapped, and the third base wall at the baseball field was destroyed. The gymnasium sustained considerable damage to its roof as well. Near the high school, the American Red Cross Building lost its roof and some of its exterior walls, and the Girl Scouts of Greater Mississippi building had its roof torn off as well. The tornado then impacted the northern fringes of downtown Hattiesburg, damaging or destroying several more homes, snapping numerous power lines, and causing heavy damage to several large brick buildings, three of which were leveled. Damage intensity throughout the city of Hattiesburg ranged from EF2 to EF3. The tornado maintained its strength as it continued into Petal, where an ACE Hardware store was completely leveled and more homes were damaged or destroyed.

Traveling to the northeast of Petal, the tornado began to weaken, causing EF1 to EF2 strength damage to numerous roofs and downing many trees. It weakened to EF1-strength in Perry County before weakening rapidly and lifting in a wooded area just west of Runnelstown at 5:36 p.m. CST (2336 UTC).

It damaged many buildings and athletic fields at University of Southern Mississippi, Oak Grove High School, and Hattiesburg High School. In Lamar County (where the tornado first touched down and was rated EF4), 51 homes were destroyed and another 170 suffered major damage. The tornado was slightly weaker in Forrest County (EF3); however, 192 homes were destroyed and 338 suffered major damage. The tornado injured 71 people (8 in Lamar County and 63 in Forrest County) and caused damage amounting to $38.525 million.

This was the first violent tornado to occur in Lamar and Forrest Counties since April 24, 1908, in which 143 people were killed. 64 deaths occurred in Lamar and Forrest Counties alone with that tornado.

Other tornadoes

A total of eight tornadoes touched down on February 10, including one in northeast Texas, five in southeast Mississippi, and two in southwest Alabama. The tornadoes caused a total of 86 injuries.

In Texas, an EF0 tornado touched down east of Livingston in Polk County. A trailer was destroyed and trees and power lines were downed, injuring one person. In Mississippi, an EF1 tornado touched down southeast of Arm in Lawrence County, causing damage to several barns and mobile homes and downing many trees. In nearby Marion County, an EF2 touched down south of the Columbia area and traveled into Lamar County, causing significant damage to many trees and numerous structures and injuring three people. This tornado lifted and the parent supercell quickly produced another tornado, which impacted the Hattiesburg area (See above), injuring 71 people. The same supercell would later produce two EF1 tornadoes across Wayne County, causing damage to many trees and structures, before moving into Alabama and dissipating.

Two EF1 tornadoes touched down across Washington and Clarke Counties in Alabama. These tornadoes removed roofs from homes, severely damaged a few mobile homes, and downed many trees, including numerous pine trees that were snapped.

Aftermath
President Barack Obama declared Mississippi a federal disaster area following the tornado. Mississippi Governor Phil Bryant issued a State of emergency for Forrest, Lamar, Lawrence, and Marion Counties due to the impact of the severe storms and tornadoes in those counties.

Rain hampered cleanup efforts in the city during the days following the tornado. Schools remained closed in the Hattiesburg area until February 14, 2013, including the University of Southern Mississippi (USM). When schools reopened, school buses had to be borrowed from neighboring school districts as most of Hattiesburg's had been damaged by the tornado. USM had to move classes that were previously held in the eight damaged buildings. USM officials estimated that it would take over 10 million dollars to repair the school. Oak Grove High School in West Hattiesburg lost its athletic facilities as well as a few other buildings. The Lamar County School Superintendent said that it would take months and millions of dollars to repair. Hattiesburg High School also suffered destruction of some of its athletic facilities, including the basketball gym that had undergone renovations just a few weeks before.

Sempra U.S. Gas & Power donated $100,000 to Hattiesburg area schools and the American Red Cross branch based in Hattiesburg.

In the early morning hours of January 21, 2017, a destructive EF3 tornado destroyed many homes and businesses in Hattiesburg and Petal. This tornado was not as powerful as the 2013 event, though it resulted in four fatalities and many injuries.

See also
 
List of North American tornadoes and tornado outbreaks
Tornado outbreak of January 21–23, 2017 – A deadly EF3 tornado followed a similar path to this tornado four years later.

References

External links
February 10, 2013 Pine Belt tornado outbreak
Tornado Event Across Southeast Mississippi and Southern Alabama

2013-02-10
Tornadoes in Mississippi
F4 tornadoes by location
Tornadoes of 2013
2013 tornado
2013 natural disasters in the United States
Hattiesburg, Mississippi tornado
February 2013 events in the United States